is a district located in Kōchi Prefecture, Japan.

As of 2003, the district has an estimated population of 10,393 and a density of 23.14 persons per km2. The total area is 449.15 km2.

Towns and villages
Motoyama
Ōtoyo

Districts in Kōchi Prefecture